The Reiley-Reeves House is a historic house located in the Garden District of Baton Rouge, Louisiana, at 810 Park Avenue.

It was constructed in c.1910-11 for planter George Junkin Reiley in the Queen Anne Revival style and it is one of the few homes from early 1900s still standing in the city, and it's the only remaining home in the city with a Queen Anne style turret and steeple.

The house was listed on the National Register of Historic Places on May 24, 1979. It was also added as a contributing resource to the Roseland Terrace Historic District at the time of its creation on March 11, 1982.

See also
National Register of Historic Places listings in East Baton Rouge Parish, Louisiana

References

External links

Historical Baton Rouge blog
Waymarking article

National Register of Historic Places in Baton Rouge, Louisiana
Houses in Baton Rouge, Louisiana
Individually listed contributing properties to historic districts on the National Register in Louisiana